United Nations of Sound is the debut album by British alternative rock band RPA & The United Nations of Sound, Richard Ashcroft's project, released on 19 July 2010 through Parlophone (see 2010 in British music). The album was released in the United States on 22 March 2011 under the name "Richard Ashcroft" through the record company Razor & Tie.

Reception

United Nations of Sound received generally scathing reviews from critics on its initial release. At Metacritic, which assigns a normalised rating out of 100 to reviews from mainstream critics, the album received an average score of 39, based on eight reviews, which indicates "Generally unfavorable reviews".
UK-based review aggregation website AnyDecentMusic? correlated 23 reviews with an ADM Rating of 4.5. In the United States, Spin Magazine said the result a "fruitful collaboration" and Nylon Magazine called the new album "a commanding performance".

Track listing

Trivia
"Are You Ready?" is featured in the 2011 Volkswagen Jetta's commercial, it has been used in Fox Sports broadcasts of Major League Baseball's postseason games including the opening of the 2010 World Series, and it was played in many ESPN promos during the 2010 FIFA World Cup. The song is also featured over the closing credits of the film The Adjustment Bureau in March 2011, along with "Future's Bright", a song written and performed specifically for the film's opening by Richard and ten-time Oscar-nominated composer Thomas Newman.
"She Brings Me the Music" appears in an episode of Chuck, Season 4 Episode 4.
"Are You Ready?" has an incorrect credit to Robin Gibb in the accompanying booklet. The sample used in the song is from the song "On Time" which is a song Maurice Gibb wrote and recorded in 1971 and issued as a B-side to Bee Gees' "My World" in January 1972.

References

External links
Richard Ashcroft – Richard Ashcroft official website
 http://www.fye.com/United-Nations-of-Sound-Front-Page_stcVVproductId127303422VVcatId455366VVviewprod.htm

Richard Ashcroft albums
2010 albums
Parlophone albums